Hydrocarbon Oil Duty (also fuel duty and fuel tax) is a fuel tax levied on some fuels used by most road motor vehicles in the United Kingdom; with exceptions for local bus services, some farm and construction vehicles and aviation, which pay reduced or no fuel duty.

The government revenue from fuel duty was £27.1 billion for the financial year 2014–2015. This is an increase in cash terms in comparison to 2013-2014 but now only represents 1.5% of GDP. This is in contrast to the start of the 2000s when it was 2.3% of GDP.  A further £3.9 billion is raised from the VAT on the duty, contributing some 3.5 per cent of total UK tax revenues. The Fuel Price Escalator, which was introduced in 1993 was abandoned after the disruptive fuel tax protests of 2000.

History
The Finance Act 1910 (the so-called People's Budget) introduced a petrol duty in the UK for the first time. From April 1909 the rate was set at 3d (£0.013) per UK gallon, bringing the price of a typical UK gallon to 1s 1½d.

It was then abolished by the Finance Act 1919 after several years of steady petrol price rises and replaced by vehicle taxation, and the tax disc based on horsepower, after which the cost of petrol was about 4s per UK gallon.

In 1928, following market reductions in the cost of a UK gallon of fuel to about 1s 2½d, the Government introduced a tax of 4d (£0.017) per UK gallon bringing the cost of a UK gallon of petrol to 1s 6¾d.

In the 1993 Budget during the Major ministry, Norman Lamont introduced a 10p rise and also a Fuel Price Escalator whereby the cost of fuel would be increased annually by 3 per cent above inflation in future years; the Petroleum Revenue Tax was reduced in the same budget and later abolished. Kenneth Clarke, the new chancellor, increased the escalator to 5p in November of that year. These increases were introduced at a time of considerable change in government transport policy, and followed major UK road protests, including the M11 link road protest and the protest at Twyford Down. The escalator was increased in 6p per year in 1997 by Gordon Brown, chancellor for the new Blair ministry.

The escalator was effectively cancelled by the Brown ministry follow severe disruption caused by the fuel tax protests in 2000. Since that time more cautious increases have been applied. A planned 3.02p/litre rise which was confirmed by the 2012 United Kingdom budget to come into effect on 1 August 2012 was later deferred until 1 January 2013 at short notice. The last increase in Fuel duty occurred in 2010. A decrease then occurred in 2022.

Rates and receipts
The rates since 23 March 2022 have been as follows:

VAT at the current rate is then added to the total price. The taxation percentage of forecourt prices varies according to the price of oil, rising from 55.9% at 65p per litre untaxed to 61.4% at 50p per litre (2012 figures).

European comparisons

The UK average petrol price as of 11 January 2016 is £1.01 per litre. This is slightly above the European average but is 30p lower than the peak in 2014. With declining oil prices, it has been suggested petrol could fall to 86.9p per litre if oil prices fall to $10 a barrel. Average diesel prices are currently £1.03 per litre. The minimum petrol price available is 99.7p and £1.03 for diesel. The minimum across Europe is 87.9.

Aviation
No duty or VAT tax is levied on jet fuel, in accordance with the Convention on International Civil Aviation, although commercial operators do pay Air Passenger Duty.

Avgas, used some smaller planes, was taxed at half the rate of road petrol for all users until October 2008, when the reduced rate was limited to commercial flying. A minority of light planes use standard road petrol and pay tax at the normal rate.

Buses

The Bus Service Operators Grant provides a fuel duty rebate to local bus service operators (but not for express coach which receives no rebate).  As of April 2010 the rebate was £0.43 for diesel, £0.2360 for road fuel gas other than natural gas and 100% for biodiesel and bioethanol. Additional rebates are available for increasing fuel efficiency, low carbon emission vehicles and equipping vehicles with Smartcards and GPS tracking equipment.

In 2001 it was proposed that long-distance scheduled coach services should receive the rebate in return for offering half-price fares to older and disabled passengers.

Construction and farm vehicles

Registered construction and farm vehicles 'red diesel' which includes a fuel dye has a significantly reduced tax levy compared to normal road fuel. This can only be used in registered agricultural and construction vehicles including tractors, excavators, cranes and there are heavy fines for misuse.

Trains
UK train operators are required pay full duty rates with the exception of biofuels, for which the duty was reduced from 53p to 8p in 2006 and for electrified services.

See also
 Road pricing in the United Kingdom
 Motoring taxation in the United Kingdom
 Fuel tax (for international comparisons)

References

External links
 Hydrocarbon Oil Duties Act 1979
 Hydrocarbon Oils Duty Rates UK HM Revenue & Customs website
 Hydrocarbon Oils: Customs Duty UK HM Revenue & Customs website
 2011 Hydrocarbon Oil Duty Rates UK HM Revenue & Customs website
 You think fuel prices are bad? Historically, they're not - and we've graphed it

Motoring taxation in the United Kingdom
Petroleum in the United Kingdom
Vehicle taxes
Fuel taxes